{{Infobox settlement
|official_name                = Kur Island
|native_name                  =   Pulau-Pulau Kur
|nickname                     =
|motto                        = 
|type                         = District
|image_skyline                = 
|imagesize                    = 
|image_caption                = 
|image_flag                   =
|image_seal                   = 
|image_shield                 =
|image_map                    = Kuur Island (Landsat).JPG
|mapsize                      =
|map_caption                  = Landsat 7 photograph of Kur
|pushpin_map_caption          = Location in Maluku Islands##Location in Indonesia
|pushpin_map                  = Indonesia Maluku#Indonesia
|pushpin_mapsize              = 
|subdivision_type             = Country
|subdivision_name             = Indonesia
|subdivision_type1            = Province
|subdivision_name1            = Maluku
|subdivision_type2            = City
|subdivision_name2            = Tual
|government_type              =
|leader_title                 = Head of district
|leader_name                  = Lajania Madamar
|leader_title1                = 
|leader_name1                 = 
|leader_title2                =
|leader_name2                 =
|leader_title3                =
|leader_name3                 =
|established_title            =  
|established_date             =
|established_title2           =  
|established_date2            =
|established_title3           =  
|established_date3            =
|area_magnitude               =
|area_total_km2               = 19.61
|area_land_km2                =
|area_water_km2               =
|area_water_percent           =
|area_urban_km2               =
|area_metro_km2               =
|population_as_of             = 2021
|population_footnotes         = 
|population_note              =
|population_total             = 2,615
|population_density_km2       = 133
|population_metro             =
|population_density_metro_km2 =
|population_urban             =
|population_density_urban_km2 =
|demographics_type1           = 
|demographics1_footnotes      = 
|demographics1_title1         = 
|demographics1_info1          = 
|timezone                     = IEST
|utc_offset                   = +9
|timezone_DST                 =
|utc_offset_DST               =
|coordinates                  = 
|elevation_m                  =
|postal_code_type             =  Postcode
|postal_code                  = 97615
|area_code                    = (+62) 916
|website                      = 
|footnotes                    =
|area_code_type               = Area code
|blank_name                   = Villages
|blank_info                   = 5
}}
Kur is an island and district of Indonesia located in the north west of the Kai Islands.

Administrative villages
Kur Island consists of 5 villages (kelurahan or desa'') namely:
Finualen
Kaimear
Lokwirin
Sermaf
Tubyal

References

External links
 

Tual
Kai Islands
Districts of Maluku (province)
Islands of the Maluku Islands